PSN-632,408 is a selective ligand for the suggested novel cannabinoid receptor GPR119.

See also 
 AR-231,453
 PSN-375,963

References 

4-Pyridyl compounds
Oxadiazoles
Piperidines
Carbamates
Tert-butyl compounds